Virginia Avenue may refer to:

 Virginia Avenue, Washington, District of Columbia, USA
 Virginia Avenue Tunnel, rail tunnel in Washington, DC, USA
 Virginia Avenue District, on Virginia Avenue, Indianapolis, Indiana, USA;
 Virginia Avenue Colored School, Louisville, Kentucky, USA
 Virginia Avenue (1973 song) by Tom Waits off the album Closing Time (album)

See also

 Virginia Street, Reno, Nevada, USA
 Virginia Street Bridge
 West Virginia Avenue, Washington, DC, USA
 Virginia (disambiguation)